Strength and Honour is an album by Finnish black metal band Satanic Warmaster. It was released in November 2001 through Northern Heritage. It was reissued twice by Northern Heritage in 2003 and 2004, both pressings limited to 1000 copies. The original LP version comes with a bonus track, officially untitled, also
referred to as "Legion Werewolf". The keyboard outro to "Night of Retribution" was originally intended to be the intro for Satanic Warmaster's unreleased "Black Metal Kommando" debut album. The album intro is an uncredited piece taken from the SPK album Zamia Lehmanni: Songs of Byzantine Flowers. The album cover features the “Spirit of Wolf” emblem by the band Black Draugwath. Satanic Warmaster apologized years later for the mistake.

Track listing 
 "Raging Winter" (4:47)
 "A New Black Order" (7:00)
 "The Burning Eyes of the Werewolf" (4:57)
 "Strength and Honour" (5:12)
 "Wolves of Blood and Iron" (5:47)
 "Der Schwarze Orden" (4:29)
 "Night of Retribution" (9:21)

Credits 
 Satanic Tyrant Werwolf - vocals, drums, bass, keyboards
 Lord War Torech - guitar

References 

2001 albums
Satanic Warmaster albums